The women's 70 kilograms (Middleweight) competition at the 2018 Asian Games in Jakarta was held on 30 August at the Jakarta Convention Center Assembly Hall.

Saki Niizoe of Japan won the gold medal.

Schedule
All times are Western Indonesia Time (UTC+07:00)

Results

Main bracket

Repechage

References

External links
 
 Official website
 Official website

W70
Judo at the Asian Games Women's Middleweight
Asian W70